Charles Montague Graham (1867 – 27 March 1938) was an Australian politician. Graham was born in Christchurch, New Zealand, and educated at state schools. He worked as a tailor and was a union official before entering parliament. He was elected as an Australian Labor Party senator at the 1922 election for a term from 1 July 1923 to 30 September 1929, but was defeated for re-election at the 1929 election.
 He later moved to Victoria, and died at his home in Clifton Hill, Melbourne in 1938.

Background
Charles Montague Graham was the eldest son of Patrick Graham, a horse trainer.

Charles Graham received his education in his home country which is New Zealand. In New Zealand, he was also trained to be a tailor but he then left New Zealand to reside in Australia. After arriving in Australia he met his wife, named Katie, and married her on 17 March 1891. He then stayed in Pell Street, Broken Hill by the year 1892. A few years after their marriage, the couple then left their place to move to Western Australia.

Once the couple arrived in Australia, he set up a business in Piesse Street, Boulder then got elected to Boulder's Municipal Council. This is when his political journey starts.

At the end of his political journey, he and his wife have one daughter named Wilmot Jane. He experienced a short illness and died in Melbourne on 27 March 1938 buried in Heidelberg Cemetery.

After mention was given of the death of Charles Montague Graham. It is written that Graham served as a member of the senate for 6 years where he was elected as a senator of Western Australia through a general election in the year 1922. He is also a part of several select committees (where one of them is the Joint Select Committee on Commonwealth Electoral Law and Procedure of 1926 to 1927) as a member. With his passing, he left his wife and a daughter.

In addition to this, although it is known that Charles Montague Graham is from New Zealand. He declared himself later during his political career in Australia that he is an Australian.

Political chronology

Story chronology
An Australian politician who migrated from New Zealand to Australia before 1892 together with his wife. He then started his journey as a politician after becoming Boulder's Municipal Council in 1922 and by June 1922, he was already placed third in the electoral ticket to becoming the Senate of Western Australia in the meantime he has also become the president of his district council. (ALP paper as cited in SAWA)

It was then mentioned by Daily News, although not much is known about Charles Graham, there are people who are assured, Charles Graham has the readiness and is a person who is able to appreciate a different point of view (Great Southern Herald Katanning, 1922, p. 22 and Kalgoorlie Miner, 1922, p. 4 and daily News Perth, 1923, p. 6).

Charles Graham himself believes that he was 'a representative of Western Australia' and claims himself to be ‘... an Australian'. After mentioning himself to be the representative of Western Australia, he delivered questions and beliefs on what can or should be done in Australia. This leads to the 'one big union' movement. After Graham defended and went against different issues and provide his support to the Senate, he toured Australia as one of Western Australia's delegates.

During his time serving the government, he pinpoints different systems within Australia which cause him to worry. With his goal to develop the Australian system. Although he also faced difficulties, as he did not have as much background about the government as he lived his whole childhood, not in a political stance of life and therefore, written by another senator that Graham may not have had the same understanding of the reason behind the current decision of the Australian Government which Graham questioned.

With the different political events which Graham experienced, he has successfully become one of Western Australia's delegates in ALP's eleventh Commonwealth Conference, although he failed to be elected in 1928's election. After failing to be elected, he decided to move to Victoria and stayed in Clifton Hill located in Melbourne.

Work
During his political period, he fought against and defended numerous beliefs and opinions. These include: Some level of profit received by Commonwealth bank should be delivered to the people, the trouble of low pensions for the aged, appeal for compassion towards those suffering from work-related illnesses, to create a minor change towards the Conciliation and Arbitration Act, fight against gold bounty, supported selective immigration, and supported an area relating to the concern of Australian Women's Commonwealth Organisations.

Earlier in his political career, he enunciate his central mission, which drew attention to him. He commented and professed his thoughts that the production of men's (soldier) caps should be protected as it is the 'true Australian sentiment'. This is one of his first objections to the Commonwealth. One of his first actions as a senate is to "Question: Invalid and Old-Age Pensions" on 5 July 1923, and his last actions in the political stance is to bring upon the government 2 questions, which are about "Wireless Advertisements" and "Retiring Senators" (Sherratt, T. as cited in Historic Hansard). It was also written about Charles Graham that who is largely known as 'a party man in debate', this statement emphasises the indication that his work will cover policy in regards to Australia, more specifically on Western Australia.

After his continuous political movement after this event. Eventually, his political career came to an end with his loss in the 1928 election. Before it came to an end, in 1927 he made one of his last speeches which is regarding expressing hope, that the time when men need to crawl like snakes to approach their masters just to beg for work had come to an end.

As his political career ended, he moved and found a job as a storeman and lastly became the committee of the Victorian Federated Storeman and Packers Union.

Similar figures, history, aftermath
A figure who is said to have worked closest with senator Charles Graham is Edward Needham. They both work as senators for Western Australia's government. They both share some common ground. The main opinions they share are the feeling of dissatisfaction towards the Commonwealth Parliament. In the Biographical dictionary for Charles Montague Graham, it is then written how Edward Needham supported his career in terms of objecting to the Commonwealth.

As in history, as a Western Australia Senator who tackles political policy. During the period when Charles Graham is an active senate representative, in different parts of Australia, such as the Northern Territory, it was brought into concern regarding some of the parliament. This can be related to the fact that during the time, Charles Graham was one of the figures who brought up the topic of the need for change in different rights acknowledgments. Major changes in the bill and the government was brought up in the territories.

There are changes that are made including a debate on the rights to vote and on house representation. The debate on the house representation. In this matter, it is aforementioned to have a similar problem which what Charles Graham addressed. Where the representation of females or the representation of different ethnicity is lacking in the government of Northern Territory.

Therefore, different proposals have been put forward regarding the circumstances of representation. Although up until 1920, which is the range of time in which Charles Graham is a senator, there was no action which is actually taken into account for the proposal given by the parliament. As has been mentioned in an online biographical dictionary that Charles Graham was a senate who sticks close to the matter of policy, specifically labour policy as the way how he worked on his political career.

Members from different senators bring the policy topic to the table. Although it is different figures brought the topic differently, it is made known that policy is a major topic in the different parts of Australia's government, where Charles Graham has taken part in one of the policy movements in one of Australia's territories, Western Australia. Even though Charles Graham is a political figure in Western Australia. He also talks about the Commonwealth Bank. The mainland Commonwealth Territory is mentioned to be both Northern Territory and Australian Capital Territory.

At the end of his career, it was seen that there were no further actions taken toward the matter which Charles Graham focused his political career on. Instead, further actions were taken after the passing of senator Charles Graham in the year of 1968. Where by the year 1975, the action/policy on the electoral senate between the Commonwealth and Australia is finally challenged across the different territories of Australia's different governments which includes: Western Australia, New South Wales, and Queensland.

The work of Charles Graham and his belief in the need for change in the policy of Western Australia and the need for change in the Commonwealth made an impact on Australia's current government. His work is shown to have created a foundation for the changes which is brought upon the policies in the Australian government after his passing

References

1867 births
1938 deaths
Australian Labor Party members of the Parliament of Australia
Members of the Australian Senate for Western Australia
Members of the Australian Senate
People from Christchurch
New Zealand emigrants to Australia
20th-century Australian politicians